Backyard Baseball is a series of baseball video games for children which was developed by Humongous Entertainment and published by Atari. It was first released in October 1997 for Macintosh and Microsoft Windows. Later games were featured on Game Boy Advance, PlayStation 2, GameCube, Wii, and iOS. It is part of the Backyard Sports series. There have been eleven different versions of the game since 1997. Some of the game titles that were created include Backyard Baseball, Backyard Baseball 2001-2010, and Backyard Sports: Sandlot Sluggers.

The original game consisted of 30 neighborhood kids from which the player must build a team. Over the years, the idea of "Pro players as kids" became popular, and the original statistics and looks of the players changed. Some of the professional players that were available included Chipper Jones,  Frank Thomas, Alex Rodriguez, Alfonso Soriano, Ichiro Suzuki, Sammy Sosa, Jim Thome, Albert Pujols, Nomar Garciaparra, Ken Griffey Jr., and Barry Bonds. As the game progresses, there are some professionals that become available or "unlockable" including Randy Johnson, Derek Jeter, and Mike Piazza.

In Backyard Baseball, players take a managerial role by creating a team of different players to compete against opponents. In the different installments, one could choose to play a one-off exhibition game or a seasonal league, followed by the "Backyard Baseball League" playoffs, which contains the American League and National League divisional series, the AL and NL championship series and finally the "Backyard Baseball World Series". Series games will vary per game.

This game has various playable modes and they include: Single Game, Batting Practice, Spectator, and Season Game.

In 2013, The Evergreen Group acquired the intellectual property from Atari.

Legacy
Pablo Sanchez, one of the fictional playable characters in the game, has been regarded as one of the strongest athletes in video game history.

The game has also been noted for its diversity (gender, race, disability, etc.) of characters, both in ratio of white to non-white and male to female, as well as skill level and the distribution of the best characters.

Players
In Backyard Baseball 2001, the Backyard kids are joined by 31 MLB pro players, many of which were all-stars during the 1999 Major League Baseball All Star Game. Eventual Hall of Fame players featured include Barry Larkin, Vladimir Guerrero, Jeff Bagwell, Larry Walker, Chipper Jones, Derek Jeter, Mike Piazza, Tony Gwynn, Ken Griffey Jr., Cal Ripken Jr., Ivan Rodriguez, and Randy Johnson, who are all playable characters to choose from.

Several of these players would be featured in multiple releases including Nomar Garciaparra, Derek Jeter, and Alex Rodriguez.

Installments

References

External links

 Official Backyard Baseball website

1997 video games
Humongous Entertainment games
Infogrames games
Atari games
Major League Baseball video games
ScummVM-supported games
Baseball genres
Classic Mac OS games
Video games developed in Canada
Video games developed in the United States
Video game franchises
Windows games